Catherine Township is a township in Ellis County, Kansas, USA.  As of the 2010 census, its population was 312.  It includes the unincorporated settlement of Catharine, Kansas, whose population was 113 in the 2020 census.

Geography
According to the USGS, it contains two cemeteries: Norman and Saint Catharina.

References
 USGS Geographic Names Information System (GNIS)

External links

 US-Counties.com
 City-Data.com

Townships in Ellis County, Kansas
Townships in Kansas